Bianca Rech (born 25 January 1981 in Bad Neuenahr-Ahrweiler, Rhineland-Palatinate) is a German footballer. She currently plays for 1. FC Köln and the German national team.

Honours

1. FFC Frankfurt
 Bundesliga: Winner (3) 2000–01, 2001–02, 2002–03, Runner-up 2003–04
 German Cup: Winner (3) 2000–01, 2001–02, 2002–03, Runner-up 2003–04
 UEFA Women's Cup: Winner 2002–03

FC Bayern Munich
Bundesliga: Runner-up 2008–09

Germany
UEFA Women's U-18 Championship: Winner 2000, Runner-up 1999

References

External links
 

 
  
  

1981 births
Living people
People from Bad Neuenahr-Ahrweiler
German women's footballers
SC 07 Bad Neuenahr players
1. FFC Frankfurt players
FC Bayern Munich (women) players
Sunnanå SK players
Damallsvenskan players
Women's association football defenders
Women's association football midfielders
Footballers from Rhineland-Palatinate
Germany women's international footballers